Georges Sérès (7 April 1884 – 26 June 1951) was a French professional cyclist who mainly specialized in motor-paced racing. In this discipline he won a gold, a silver and a bronze medal at the world championships in 1920, 1924 and 1925, respectively. He crashed in a 1922 race in New Bedford and had 17 fractures after being run over by a pacer.

Still a teenager, he participated in the 1905 and 1906 edition of the Tour de France, but did not manage to finish either of them. In 1908 he achieved a 5th place in the highly regarded classic Paris - Tours.

On the track he also won three six-day races in Paris, in 1921, 1922 and 1924.

His sons Georges and Arthur were also competitive cyclists.

References

1884 births
1951 deaths
French male cyclists
People from Gers
UCI Track Cycling World Champions (men)
French track cyclists